Roger Bridgewater (died 1754) was a British stage actor of the eighteenth century. He worked as party of the Drury Lane company for many years, specialising in dramatic roles, before switching to Covent Garden in 1734. In later years he frequently played Falstaff.

Selected roles
 Earl of Northumberland in Sir Thomas Overbury by Richard Savage (1723)
 Captain Gaylove in A Wife to be Let by Eliza Haywood (1723)
 Orbasius in The Captives by John Gay (1724)
 Ulysses in Hecuba by Richard West (1726)
 Count Basset in The Provoked Husband by Colley Cibber (1728)
 Malvil in Love in Several Masques by Henry Fielding (1728)
 Timophanes in Timoleon by Benjamin Martyn (1730)
 Lord Briton in Bayes's Opera by Gabriel Odingsells (1730)
 Shamwell in The Humours of Oxford by James Miller (1730)
 Laelius in Sophonisba by James Thomson (1730)
 Athelwold in Athelwold by Aaron Hill (1731)
 Thorowgood in The London Merchant by George Lillo (1731)
 Leonidas in Eurydice by David Mallet (1731)
 Lovemore in Caelia by Charles Johnson (1732)
 Modern in The Modern Husband by Henry Fielding (1732)
 Pierrot in Timon in Love by John Kelly (1733)
Frederick in The Miser by Henry Fielding (1733)
 Squire Trelooby in The Cornish Squire by James Ralph (1734)
 Modern in The Rival Widows by Elizabeth Cooper (1735)
 Strictland in The Suspicious Husband by Benjamin Hoadly (1747)

References

Bibliography
 Highfill, Philip H, Burnim, Kalman A. & Langhans, Edward A. A Biographical Dictionary of Actors, Actresses, Musicians, Dancers, Managers, and Other Stage Personnel in London, 1660-1800: Garrick to Gyngell. SIU Press, 1978.
 Straub, Kristina, G. Anderson, Misty and O'Quinn, Daniel . The Routledge Anthology of Restoration and Eighteenth-Century Drama. Taylor & Francis,  2017.

18th-century English people
English male stage actors
British male stage actors
18th-century English male actors
18th-century British male actors
Year of birth unknown
1754 deaths